Piletocera leucodelta is a moth in the family Crambidae. It was described by Edward Meyrick in 1937. It is found on the Solomon Islands, where it has been recorded from New Georgia.

References

leucodelta
Moths described in 1937
Moths of Oceania